Jeudy is a surname. Notable people with the surname include:

Charlot Jeudy (1984–2019), Haitian LGBT rights activist
Jean Jeudy (born 1958), American politician
Jean-Jacob Jeudy (born 1970), Haitian journalist
Jerry Jeudy (born 1999), American football wide receiver
Sherly Jeudy (born 1998), Haitian footballer 
Vicky Jeudy, Haitian-American actress
Yves Jeudy (born 1958), Haitian boxer

See also
Judy (disambiguation)